Stephan is a male given name, a variant of Stephen.

People with the name
 Stephan, Prince of Lippe (born 1959), German royal
 Stephan Aarstol, American internet entrepreneur and author
 Stephan Ackermann (born 1963), German Catholic bishop
 Stephan Albani (born 1968), German physicist and politician
 Stephan Kofi Ambrosius (born 1998), German professional footballer
 Stephan Maigaard Andersen (born 1981), Danish professional footballer
 Stephan Andrist (born 1987), Swiss footballer
 Stephan Baard (born 1992), a Namibian cricketer
 Stephan Balint (1943–2007), Hungarian writer, actor, theatre director, and playwright 
 Stephan Balliet, a German convicted murderer
 Stephan Beeharry (born 1975), Mauritian badminton player
 Stephan Berwick, American author, martial artist, and actor
 Stephan Bodecker (1384–1459), bishop of Brandenburg and scholar of Hebrew texts
 Stephan Bodzin (born 1969), German DJ techno-producer, performer, and label founder
 Stephan Bonnar (1977–2022), an American professional wrestler, retired mixed martial arts fighter
 Stephan Brandner (born 1966), a German far-right politician
 Stephan Braunfels (born 1950), a German architect
 Stephan Brenninkmeijer (born 1964), Dutch film director, screenwriter, and producer
 Stephan Burger (born 1962), a German Roman Catholic archbishop
 Stephan Bürgler (born 1987), Austrian football player
 Stephan Burián von Rajecz (1851–1922), Austro-Hungarian politician, diplomat, and statesman
 Stephan Chase (1945–2019), British actor
 Stephan Dahl (born 1971), British professor of marketing
 Stephan Dabbert (born 1958), German agricultural economist and professor
 Stephan de Wit (born 1992), South African rugby union player
 Stephan Dippenaar (born 1988), South African retired rugby union footballer
 Stephan Dorfmeister (1729–1797), German-Hungarian painter
 Stephan DuCharme (born 1964), American-German international businessman
 Stephan Dupuis, Canadian make-up artist
 Stephan Dweck (born 1960), American humorist, attorney, radio show host, and author
 Stephan Eberharter, an Austrian skier
 Stephan El Shaarawy, Italian footballer who plays for A.C. Milan
 Stephan Endlicher (1804–1849), Austrian botanist, numismatist and Sinologist
 Stephan R. Epstein, a British economic historian
 Stephan Franck, Franco-American animator, writer, director, and comics creator
 Stephan A. Hoeller, American author, scholar, and neo-Gnostic bishop
 Stephan Jenkins, an American musician
 Stephan Kampwirth (born 1967), German actor
 Stephan Kinsella (born 1965), American lawyer and author
 Stephan Klapproth, a Swiss journalist and television presenter
 Stephan Knoll (born 1982), Australian politician
 Stephan Koplowitz (born 1956), director, choreographer, and media artist 
 Stephan Koranyi (born 1956), German philologist, author, lecturer, and an editor
 Stephan Körner, a British philosopher
 Stephan Krawczyk (born 1955), German writer and songwriter
 Stephan Krehl (1864–1924), German composer, teacher, and theoretician
 Stephan Kuttner (1907–1996), German-American author, professor, ancient law expert
 Stephan Lehnstaedt (born 1980), German historian 
 Stephan Letter (born 1978), German serial killer
 Stephan Moccio, Canadian composer, producer, and recording artist
 Stephan Niklaus, a Swiss decathlete
 Stephan Palla (born 1989), an Austrian-Filipino footballer
 Stephan Pastis, an American cartoonist
 Stephan Remmler, a German musician
 Stephan Hanna Stephan (1894–1949), a Christian Arab Palenstian writer
 Stephan Sunthararaj, child rights activist in Sri Lanka who disappeared
 Stephan Talty (born c.1960), an American journalist and author
 Stephan Weil, a German politician 
 Stephan Alexander Würdtwein (1719–1796), German theologian, auxiliary bishop, and historian

See also
Steph
Stefan (given name)
Stef
Steff
Steffl
Stephanie
Stephen
Stephon Marbury
Steven